Hasselager is a small suburban area in the south-western part of Aarhus in Denmark. It is about 8 km from the city center and has approximately 7.437 (2018) residents, mostly of Danish heritage.

Hasselager has largely merged with neighbouring area Kolt in modern times, and the two are collectively known and referred to as Kolt-Hasselager, with shared postal code 8361. The area is predominantly residential and includes the Hasselhøj development, but also contains a large industrial park.

References

Sources 
Ormslev Kolt Lokalhistoriske samling: Hasselager, archives on local history

External links 

Neighborhoods of Aarhus